Joe Flanigan (born January 5, 1967) is an American writer and actor best known for his portrayal of the character Major/Lt. Colonel John Sheppard in Stargate Atlantis.

Early life
Flanigan was born Joseph Dunnigan III in Los Angeles. He has said that his mother, Nancy, left his father soon after he was born and that his surname was changed to Flanigan after he was adopted by his stepfather, business executive John Flanigan. When he was six years old, his family moved to a small ranch near Reno, Nevada.

From the age of 14, Flanigan attended a boarding school in Ojai, California, where he appeared in the school production of A Streetcar Named Desire. He later earned a history degree at the University of Colorado where he appeared in the play Coriolanus. On the advice of a friend, he took acting classes to overcome his shyness but did not plan to pursue a career in acting. As part of the Junior Year Abroad program, Flanigan spent a year studying at the Sorbonne in Paris, where he learned French.

Career
After graduation, he pursued a writing career. He worked on Capitol Hill on President George H. W. Bush's advance team. and then briefly for several New York City publications, including Town & Country and Interview magazine. On the advice of some of his friends, he studied at the Neighborhood Playhouse, was coached by Gerald Gordon, and then moved back to Los Angeles in 1994 to pursue an acting career.

Flanigan had guest roles in numerous television series including Profiler, First Monday, and Sisters, until he got his breakthrough with his role on Stargate Atlantis as Lt. Colonel John Sheppard. He lived in Vancouver, British Columbia, Canada, where the series was filmed during the week, and flew to Los Angeles during the weekends where his wife and children resided. He additionally wrote for the series and created the stories for the Stargate Atlantis second season episode "Epiphany" and the fourth season episode "Outcast".

In September 2007, scifi.com's SciFi Wire service reported that, "Talent agency UTA filed suit on Sept. 24 against Stargate Atlantis star Joe Flanigan in Los Angeles Superior Court, claiming that the actor owes $99,225 in commissions, according to The Hollywood Reporter; Flanigan's manager, John Carrabino, told the trade paper about the lawsuit: 'I had no idea they did this. This is the first time I'm hearing about this.'" UTA filed a similar lawsuit against actor Wesley Snipes, who was equally surprised. This suit was settled in December 2008.

Flanigan appears in Brooks Institute photographer John A. Russo's upcoming book About Face. Part of the proceeds are to be donated to Smile Train.

In 2019, Flanigan joined the cast of General Hospital as recurring character Dr. Neil Byrne.

In contemporary culture

Flanigan features in the contemporary public artwork, Metascifi (2015) by artist Martin Firrell. Metascifi presents social comment, and philosophical truths about living well, derived from observation of popular American television science fiction. The project features performers and characters from Stargate, Star Trek, Farscape, Firefly and Warehouse 13.

As the 'meta' element of the title suggests, the artwork invites Flanigan to comment on the wider social and narrative significance of his Stargate Atlantis character John Sheppard. Most notably, he speaks about the sexual attraction of the archetypal action hero, suggesting it is the impression of the hero's agency in the world that underpins people's attraction to characters of John Sheppard's nature.

Personal life
Flanigan married Katherine Kousi, an actress and painter, in 1996. They have three sons. In early 2014, it was announced they had separated.

Flanigan took two prizes in the Waterkeepers' Alliance downhill skiing competition at Lake Louise in January 2006, an event fellow Stargate lead Richard Dean Anderson has attended as well. He currently resides in Malibu, California. 
On November 10, 2018, the Malibu home he was renting from a local family was lost in the Woolsey Fire.

Filmography

References

External links

1967 births
American male television actors
American television writers
American male television writers
Living people
People from Washoe County, Nevada
People from Greater Los Angeles
University of Colorado alumni
University of Paris alumni
Writers from Los Angeles
Screenwriters from California
Screenwriters from Nevada
American expatriates in France